Bakuro may refer to:

Bakuro-chō Kyoto
Bakuro (Bakuro, the Horse Trainer), a Japanese Kyōgen classical demon comedy